"Muzaik" is a song by the Danish dance-pop duo Infernal. It was released as the third and final single from their second studio album, Waiting for Daylight, in 2001. It was awarded "Danish Club Hit of the Year" at the 2002 Danish Music Awards.

Track listings

Credits and personnel
Written by Infernal, Oriental Mood
Produced and arranged by Infernal
Recorded by Infernal at the Infernal Studio
Mixed by Infernal
Instruments by Infernal
Percussion by Lars Bo Kujahn and Frank Juul
Vocals by Infernal
Additional vocals by Oriental Mood
Additional drum programming by Kjeld Tolstrup
Mastered by Michael Pfundheller @ Flex Studio
"Muzaik" (Tandu Remix): remixed by DJ Tandu
"Arabian Sushi": written by Infernal. Produced and arranged by Infernal. Recorded and mixed by Infernal @ the Infernal Studio. Additional keyboards and percussion by Peter Düring. Kavala by Yasar Tas

Charts

References

2001 singles
Infernal (Danish band) songs
2000 songs
Songs written by Lina Rafn
Songs written by Paw Lagermann